The 1958 UC Santa Barbara Gauchos football team represented University of California, Santa Barbara (UCSB) during the 1958 NCAA College Division football season.

UCSB competed in the California Collegiate Athletic Association (CCAA). The team was led by third-year head coach Ed Cody, and played home games at La Playa Stadium in Santa Barbara, California. They finished the season with a record of four wins, four losses and one tie (4–4–1, 3–2 CCAA).

Schedule

Notes

References

UC Santa Barbara
UC Santa Barbara Gauchos football seasons
UC Santa Barbara Gauchos football